Agustín de Carvajal, O.S.A. (August 28, 1558 – August 19, 1618) was a Roman Catholic prelate who served as the first Bishop of Ayacucho o Huamanga (1612–1618)
and Bishop of Panamá (1605–1612).

Biography
Agustín de Carvajal was born in Guadalajara, México and ordained a priest in the Order of Saint Augustine. On July 18, 1605, Pope Paul V, appointed him Bishop of Panamá. In 1608, he was consecrated bishop. On May 7, 1612, Pope Clement VIII, appointed him the first Bishop of Ayacucho o Huamanga where he served until his death on August 19, 1618.

While bishop, he was the primary consecrator of Lorenzo Pérez de Grado as Bishop of Paraguay.

References

External links and additional sources
 (for Chronology of Bishops) 
 (for Chronology of Bishops) 
 (for Chronology of Bishops) 
 (for Chronology of Bishops) 

1558 births
1618 deaths
Bishops appointed by Pope Paul V
People from Guadalajara, Jalisco
Augustinian bishops
17th-century Roman Catholic bishops in Panama
17th-century Roman Catholic bishops in Peru
Roman Catholic bishops of Panamá
Roman Catholic bishops of Ayacucho